Ancylosis citrinella is a species of snout moth in the genus Ancylosis. It was described by Émile Louis Ragonot, in 1887. It is found in Algeria.

The wingspan is 8 mm.

References

Moths described in 1887
citrinella
Endemic fauna of Algeria
Moths of Africa